Birkenwald (Alsatian: Bìrikewàld) is a former commune in the Bas-Rhin department in northeastern France. On 1 January 2016, it was merged into the new commune Sommerau.

Geography
Birkenwald is located at the foot of Vosges Mountains, in the small valley formed by Sommerau river, that feeds the Mossig. It limits with Dimbsthal and Salenthal at northeast, Allenwiller at east, Wangenbourg-Engenthal at southwest and Hengwiller at northeast.
The landscape in the south of the commune is mostly dominated by forests. Other areas surrounding it are covered by meadows and fruit trees, located in an inhabited area.

The National Route 4 is 2.5 miles away, connecting the town to Strasbourg and Saverne.
The communal road 229 connects the town with Dimbsthal and Obersteigen. The public transportation of Birkenwald is managed by Low-Rhine 67 network, line 404.

History
The commune was established on 17 February 843.
The village probably was formerly located on the hillside where a vault was found which dated from 1751.
Château de Birkenwald was built in 1562 in the Renaissance style. I

Population

Gallery

See also
Communes of the Bas-Rhin department

References

Former communes of Bas-Rhin
Populated places disestablished in 2016